Cine lenses or cinema lenses are lenses that are designed especially for cinematography, and whose main distinguishing feature from conventional photographic lenses is the "clickless" or "declicked" aperture ring. Markings on the aperture ring indicate T-stops rather than f-stops as used in still photography. Furthermore, it is a desirable characteristic for cine lenses to occupy the same form factor as each other so as to be readily interchangeable and identical in operation. This particularly applies to lenses with different focal lengths. In order to maximise interchangeability, lenses within a series of cine lenses are often identical in transmittance of light (maximum T-stop).

Anamorphic lenses for cinematography may also be classified as cine lenses.

Manufacturers

The following companies produce cine lenses:
Angénieux
Arri
Atlas Lens Co.
Canon Inc.
Cooke Optics
Fujifilm
Irix
Leica
Rokinon
Samyang Optics
Sigma Corp.
Vantage®
Zeiss
Nitecore
Venus Optics

References

Photographic lenses

Film and video terminology
Television terminology